Black Metal Massacre Live is a live album by Finnish black metal band Satanic Warmaster. It was released in April 2007 through Deathrash Armageddon.

Track listing 
 "The Vampiric Tyrant" (04:40)
 "The Burning Eyes of the Werewolf" (04:03)
 "Carelian Satanist Madness" (07:34)
 "Raging Winter" (03:47)
 "Satanic Winter" (05:50)
 "My Kingdom of Darkness" (04:12)
 "A Raven's Song" (04:45)
 "Take Me to the Top" (Mötley Crüe cover) (02:59)

Credits 
 Satanic Tyrant Werwolf aka. Nazgul - all instruments and vocals

Satanic Warmaster albums
2007 live albums